William Bernard Hall (February 22, 1894 in Charleston, West Virginia – August 15, 1947 in Newport, Kentucky) was a pitcher in Major League Baseball. He pitched in three games for the 1913 Brooklyn Dodgers.

External links

1894 births
1947 deaths
Baseball players from West Virginia
Major League Baseball pitchers
Brooklyn Superbas players
Scranton Miners players
Utica Utes players
Wilkes-Barre Barons (baseball) players